Neurigona dimidiata is a species of long-legged fly in the family Dolichopodidae.

References

External links

 

Neurigoninae
Articles created by Qbugbot
Insects described in 1861
Taxa named by Hermann Loew